Frank Quintero (born Juan Francisco Quintero Mendoza ) is a Venezuelan singer-songwriter, guitarist and drummer specialized in pop music.

Biography 
Born in Caracas, November 27, 1952 Quintero began playing drums with rock-oriented bands. Eventually, he picked up important experience while performing with jazz and latin groups before getting around to record his first solo album, Después de la tormenta, released in 1976 by the CBS-Columbia label. The highlight of this album is La Dama de la Ciudad, a romantic waltz ballad that became a huge success on the radio and charts.

The next year came his second production, Travesía, a rock-pop production recorded in Caracas, New York City and Trinidad. This production gained a significant support from his followers, which prompted the release of Hechizo in 1978, recorded between Caracas and New York. This time, Quintero added a jazzy touch to the production, incorporating a horns section that included the Brecker Brothers (Randy and Michael), Dave Sanborn and Barry Rogers.

1979 start studies at Berklee College of Music in Boston, Massachusetts, In 1982, he obtained the titles of Musician Performer on Drums and Producer at Berklee, within the mention Professional Musician. That year he returned to Venezuela for continuing to expand his professional life, while sporadically he continued traveling to Los Angeles and New York for the same purpose.

Afterwards, Quintero became a prolific songwriter, band leader and productor, releasing 21 records in a span of 35 years. In between, he also has collaborated with other artists in multiple recordings through his creativity and musical versatility.

Discography

Sources

1952 births
Living people
Musicians from Caracas
Venezuelan bandleaders
Venezuelan male composers
Venezuelan drummers
Venezuelan pop singers